Sphesihle Maduna (born 26 December 1999) is a South African soccer player who plays as a midfielder for South African Premier Division side AmaZulu.

Early and personal life
Maduna was born in Watersmeet.

Club career
He played youth football with Lamontville Golden Arrows between 2012 and 2014, before joining AmaZulu's youth team in 2016. He was promoted to AmaZulu's senior squad in February 2018, at the age of 18.

References

Living people
1999 births
South African soccer players
People from Alfred Duma Local Municipality
Soccer players from KwaZulu-Natal
Association football midfielders
AmaZulu F.C. players
South African Premier Division players